Dharampani is a market center in Bandipur Municipality in Tanahu District in the Gandaki Zone of central Nepal. The formerly Village Development Committee was merged to form new municipality since 18 May 2014. At the time of the 1991 Nepal census it had a population of 3444 people living in 616 individual households.

References

External links
UN map of the municipalities of Tanahu District

Populated places in Tanahun District